Shaare Zedek Congregation  is a Conservative Jewish synagogue located in the residential district of Notre-Dame-de-Grâce in Montreal, Quebec, Canada.

Founded in 1953 as the Jewish Congregation of Western N.D.G., the synagogue was established to meet the needs of those Jewish families moving to western Montreal and to set up a Hebrew elementary school.

At first, both school and services were housed in temporary locations until land was purchased and a building constructed. The new building, on Chester in N.D.G., was ready in 1954; it was further expanded in 1962. In 1955, the school became affiliated with the United Talmud Torahs of Montreal and is now rented as a day care center. Started as an Orthodox synagogue, the congregation changed to the Conservative rite in 1955. The facade of the synagogue, added in 1985, depicts the Ten Commandments in blue neon lights.

External links
 Shaare Zedek Congregation

References

Jewish organizations established in 1953
Synagogues in Montreal
Conservative synagogues in Canada
Synagogues completed in 1954
20th-century religious buildings and structures in Canada